The third season of America's Best Dance Crew premiered on January 15, 2009. The season was once again hosted by Mario Lopez and featured Layla Kayleigh as the backstage correspondent. Lil Mama, JC Chasez, and Shane Sparks returned as the judging panel. This was the first season without a special casting episode. In the live finale, which aired on March 5, 2009, Quest Crew was declared the winner.

Cast 
Similar to the first season, nine dance crews were selected to compete on America's Best Dance Crew, as opposed to ten. While the crews were not officially divided into the usual four regions (East Coast, West Coast, Midwest, and South) as with the previous two seasons, the regions were still listed on each crew's banner. This was also the first season to showcase a crew from the Caribbean. Team Millennia, who was eliminated during the Season 2 casting special, returned as one of the nine official dance crews.

Results

Key
 (WINNER) The dance crew won the competition and was crowned "America's Best Dance Crew".
 (RUNNER-UP) The dance crew was the runner-up in the competition.
 (IN) The dance crew was safe from elimination.
 (RISK) The dance crew was at risk for elimination.
 (OUT) The dance crew was eliminated from the competition.

Episodes

Episode 1: Sudden Death Challenge
Original Airdate: January 15, 2009
The crews performed to the songs of their choosing. Then, the judges chose the bottom three crews to compete in a sudden death dance battle to "Live Your Life" by T.I. Rynan "Kid Rainen" Paguio from JabbaWockeeZ temporarily guest judged in place of JC Chasez, who later returned the following episode.

Safe: Strikers All-Stars, Beat Freaks, Quest Crew, Ringmasters, Dynamic Edition, Team Millennia
Bottom 3: G.O.P. Dance, Fly Khicks, Boxcuttuhz
Eliminated: G.O.P. Dance

Episode 2: Fit Test Challenge
Original Airdate: January 22, 2009
Each crew was given a physical activity/exercise to incorporate into their routine.

Safe: Quest Crew, Fly Khicks, Strikers All-Stars, Beat Freaks, Dynamic Edition, Ringmasters
Bottom 2: Team Millennia, Boxcuttuhz
Eliminated: Boxcuttuhz

Episode 3: Britney Challenge
Original Airdate: January 29, 2009
The crews took inspiration from Britney Spears' music videos to create their routines. Andre Fuentes, Spears' choreographer, assigned additional challenges for the crews to complete.

Safe: Beat Freaks, Strikers All-Stars, Dynamic Edition, Quest Crew, Fly Khicks
Bottom 2: Team Millennia, Ringmasters
Eliminated: Team Millennia

Episode 4: Whack Track Challenge
Original Airdate: February 5, 2009
The crews performed to cliché songs that spurred uncool and silly dance crazes. Each crew had to incorporate their respective song's dance into their routines, while also trying to make the moves look fresh.

Safe: Quest Crew, Strikers All-Stars, Beat Freaks, Dynamic Edition
Bottom 2: Ringmasters, Fly Khicks
Eliminated: Ringmasters

Episode 5: Illusion Challenge
Original Airdate: February 12, 2009
The crews had to perform their routines utilizing various magic tricks and illusions.

Safe: Beat Freaks, Quest Crew, Strikers All-Stars
Bottom 2: Dynamic Edition, Fly Khicks
Eliminated: Dynamic Edition

Episode 6: Battle of the Sexes Challenge
Original Airdate: February 19, 2009
The episode started off with a group performance, choreographed by Napoleon and Tabitha D'umo, featuring Ludacris' "What Them Girls Like" and Beyoncé's "Single Ladies".

The two remaining male crews then battled against the two remaining female crews. Each crew had to emulate a male or female superstar's music video, and were challenged to incorporate the spirit of the video into their choreography.

Safe: Quest Crew, Beat Freaks
Bottom 2: Strikers All-Stars, Fly Khicks
Eliminated: Strikers All-Stars

Episode 7: Hip-Hop Decathlon Challenge
Original Airdate: February 26, 2009
The crews competed against each other in two challenges: the Hip-Hop Decathlon and the Last Chance Challenge. After the mid-show elimination, the top two crews performed their routines for the Last Chance Challenge.

Challenge #1: Hip-Hop Decathlon Challenge
The three remaining crews had to demonstrate their versatility by creating a routine that incorporated five different hip hop dance styles. The competitors were given the same five styles and songs, and received help from five guest ABDC alumni from the previous two seasons. Each alumnus/alumna was assigned to one of the dance styles the crews were responsible for.

Safe: Beat Freaks
Bottom 2: Quest Crew, Fly Khicks
Eliminated: Fly Khicks

Challenge #2: Last Chance Challenge
The two finalists were given one last chance to perform before the lines opened for the final voting session of the season.

Episode 8: The Live Finale
Original Airdate: March 5, 2009
The eliminated crews returned and performed with the finalists for a collaboration. The judges each picked three crews that complemented each other and their dance styles. Instead of going head-to-head, Quest Crew and Beat Freaks teamed up for their last performance.

Winner: Quest Crew
Runner-up: Beat Freaks

References

External links
 

2009 American television seasons
America's Best Dance Crew